Wola Pasikońska  is a village in the administrative district of Gmina Kampinos, inside Warsaw West County, Masovian Voivodeship, in east-central Poland.

The village has a population of two hundred and sixty.

References

Villages in Warsaw West County